Thyne may refer to:

Thyne, an older name for Tuna el-Gebel, a necropolis in Al Minya Governorate, Egypt
Turbonilla thyne, species of sea snail

People with the surname 
 Bob Thyne (1920–1986), Scottish footballer
 T. J. Thyne (born 1975), American actor